The 1916 Washington gubernatorial election was held on November 7, 1916. Incumbent Democrat Ernest Lister defeated Republican nominee Henry McBride with 48.10% of the vote.

Primary elections
Primary elections were held on September 12, 1916.

Democratic primary

Candidates 
Ernest Lister, incumbent Governor
William Edwin Cass

Results

Republican primary

Candidates
Henry McBride, former Governor
Roland H. Hartley, State Representative
W. J. Sutton
George A. Lee
Robert T. Hodge
James McNeely
John G. Lewis
J. E. Frost

Results

General election

Candidates
Major party candidates
Ernest Lister, Democratic
Henry McBride, Republican 

Other candidates
L. E. Katterfeld, Socialist
August B.L. Gellerman, Prohibition
James Bradford, Progressive
James E. Riordan, Socialist Labor

Results

References

1916
Washington
Gubernatorial